Where Your Road Leads is the seventh studio album by American country music singer Trisha Yearwood, released in 1998 by MCA Nashville.

The album reached #3 on the Billboard country albums chart. The singles "There Goes My Baby", "Where Your Road Leads", "Powerful Thing" and "I'll Still Love You More" were all released from this album, peaking at #2, #18, #6 and #10, respectively, on the Billboard country music charts between 1998 and 1999. The title track was co-written by Victoria Shaw, who originally recorded it on her 1995 album In Full View. Buddy Miller provides harmony vocals on the track "Bring Me All Your Lovin'." "I'll Still Love You More" was written by Diane Warren, who also wrote Yearwood's hit from the previous year, "How Do I Live."

Track listing

Personnel

Musicians 
As listed in liner notes.

 Trisha Yearwood – lead vocals, backing vocals
 John Hobbs – acoustic piano, keyboards 
 Steve Nathan – acoustic piano, keyboards, Hammond organ, additional strings (11)
 Matt Rollings – acoustic piano, keyboards 
 Bobby Wood – acoustic piano, organ
 Larry Byrom – acoustic guitar, electric guitar
 Mark Casstevens – acoustic guitar
 Steve Gibson – acoustic guitar, electric guitar, mandolin
 Kenny Greenberg – electric guitar
 Chris Leuzinger – electric guitar
 Brent Mason – electric guitar, six-string bass
 Steuart Smith – electric guitar
 Paul Franklin – steel guitar
 Sam Bush – mandolin
 Mike Chapman – bass
 Michael Rhodes – bass 
 Paul Leim – drums, percussion 
 Milton Sledge – drums, percussion
 Stuart Duncan – fiddle
 Conni Ellisor – string arrangements (8, 11)
 The Nashville String Machine – strings (8, 11)
 Al Anderson – backing vocals
 Tim Buppert – backing vocals
 Tabitha Fair – backing vocals 
 Gordon Kennedy – backing vocals
 Wayne Kirkpatrick – backing vocals
 Buddy Miller – backing vocals
 Kim Richey – backing vocals
 John Wesley Ryles – backing vocals
 Harry Stinson – backing vocals
 Garth Brooks – lead vocals (11)

Choir on "Where Your Road Leads"
 Lisa Cochran, Mike Eldred, Kim Fleming, Vicki Hampton, Mark Ivey, Lisa Silver, Bergen White and Dennis Wilson. Choral vocals arranged by Bergen White.

Production 
 Tony Brown – producer (1-10)
 Trisha Yearwood – producer (1-10)
 Allen Reynolds – producer (11)
 Rory Kaplan – executive producer
 Bill Neighbors – executive producer
 Jeff Balding – recording, overdub recording 
 Mark Miller – recording 
 Steve Marcantonio – overdub recording 
 Mark Hagan – assistant engineer
 Joe Hayden – assistant engineer
 Duke Duczer – recording assistant
 David Hall – recording assistant
 Glenn Spinner – recording assistant, overdub recording assistant 
 Tim Waters – recording assistant, additional overdub recording 
 Russ Martin – additional overdub recording 
 Chuck Ainlay – mixing
 Mark Ralston – mix assistant 
 Don Cobb – digital editing
 Denny Purcell – mastering 
 Jeff Levison – remastering
 Ric Wilson – remastering
 Jessie Noble – project coordinator
 Beth Middleworth – art direction, design 
 Russ Harrington – photography
 Mary Beth Felts – make-up
 Maria Smoot – hair stylist 
 Sheri McCoy-Hanes – stylist 
 Kragen & Co. – management 

Studios
 Recorded at Ocean Way Nashville and Jack's Tracks Recording Studios (Nashville, Tennessee).
 Overdubbed at Ocean Way Recording and Emerald Sound Studios (Nashville, Tennessee).
 Mixed at The Sound Kitchen (Franklin, Tennessee) and Jack's Tracks Recording Studios.
 Mastered at Georgetown Masters (Nashville, Tennessee).

Charts

Weekly charts

Year-end charts

Singles

Certifications

References

MCA Records albums
Trisha Yearwood albums
1998 albums
Albums produced by Tony Brown (record producer)